Wrong Side of the Tracks is a Spanish drama television series created by Aitor Gabilondo and David Bermejo, starring José Coronado, Nona Sobo and Luis Zahera that began airing on Telecinco on 1 February 2022.

Premise 
Set in Entrevías, the poorest neighborhood in Madrid, the series follows Tirso Abantos, a former military man running a hardware store, whose monotonous daily routine is shaken when his unruly and rebellious adopted teenaged granddaughter Irene, of Vietnamese origin, arranges for her Colombian-immigrant boyfriend, Nelson, to steal heroin from drug dealer Sandro. While the young couple had planned to sell the drugs and run off together, the plan goes wrong, and she is violently raped by Sandro and his thugs. Tirso then teams up with corrupt police officer Ezequiel to face up to the criminals in the neighborhood.

Cast

Main cast

Recurring cast

Production 
Created by Aitor Gabilondo and David Bermejo, Entrevías is a co-production by Mediaset España and Alea Media. Jordi Terradas, Patricia Trueba, Víctor Pedreira and Natxo López comprised the writing team.

José Coronado, Luis Zahera, Nona Sobo and Felipe Londoño were announced in lead roles, as an army veteran store owner, a morally ambiguous policeman, the store owner's visiting teenaged granddaughter and her local boyfriend, respectively.

Mediaset España reported the beginning of filming on 5 February 2021. The filming crew worked in Villaverde Alto, and the exterior of the Church of San Andrés was used as a shooting location.

In November 2022, the series was renewed for a third season, with Natalia Dicenta, Michelle Calvó, Óscar Higares, and Álex Medina announced as cast additions.

Release 
Mediaset España scheduled a 1 February 2022 premiere date on Telecinco. Telecinco decided on the run to air the two filmed seasons in a row. After several series earning poor ratings in their linear run on Telecinco, Wrong Side of the Tracks proved to be an emphatic audience success for the channel. The 16-episode broadcasting run ended on 17 May 2022 with the airing of the finale, drawing an audience of near 1.9 million viewers in prime time. The second season of Wrong Side of the Tracks was released by Netflix on 1 March 2023.

Season 1

Season 2

Accolades 

|-
| align = "center" | 2022 || 28th Forqué Awards || Best TV Actor || Luis Zahera ||  || 
|-
| align = "center" | 2023 || 31st Actors and Actresses Union Awards || Best Television Actor in a Secondary Role || Manolo Caro ||  || 
|}

References 

2022 Spanish television series debuts
2020s Spanish drama television series
Television shows filmed in Spain
Television shows set in Madrid
Spanish-language television shows
Telecinco network series

External links